Helicarion australis is a species of air-breathing land snail or semi-slug, terrestrial pulmonate gastropod molluscs in the family Helicarionidae. This species is endemic to Australia.

Description
These snails are smaller than the common garden snails and more colourful. The shell shape is a flattish spiral.

References

Helicarionidae
Gastropods described in 1862
Taxonomy articles created by Polbot